Tom Wall is an American singer-songwriter, musician and activist from Grand Rapids, Michigan. Wall is known for being the lead singer, guitarist, and bandleader of the progressive rock band Cosmic Knot, and for his collaborations with Muruga Booker.

Wall prefers to play in alternate tunings, such as Verdi tuning (A = 432 Hz) as opposed to the A440 (pitch standard) in the hopes of promoting a healing and overall calming effect on listeners.

Wall began playing guitar as a teenager, and was soon writing songs and performing in local bands. In 2013, he began playing with Hannah Rose Graves and the GravesTones. In 2015 Wall played guitar on the Skee-Town Stylee album All You Want.

In 2015, he formed the band Cosmic Knot and that same year they headlined at the annual Wish You Were Here festival in Fremont, Michigan, where he also jammed with P-Funk All Stars members Muruga Booker and Tony "Strat" Thomas. Tom Wall and Cosmic Knot headlined the 2016 and 2017 Wish You Were Here festivals as well.

Booker and Wall have collaborated on several musical projects together, including The Muruga Band "Mystic World", which was nominated for a 2015 Detroit Music Award, and Muruga Blues Band "Fool's Blues", which was nominated for a 2016 Detroit Music Award.

In 2016, Cosmic Knot recorded their debut album called Inner Space at Third Coast Recording Studio, in Grand Haven, Michigan. Inner Space was released in August 2017, with all of the songs having been written by Wall. In 2017, even before their debut album was released, Cosmic Knot won the Best Song contest at Grand Haven's Walk the Beat festival for their song "Like a Gypsy".

At the 2017 Hash Bash in Ann Arbor, Michigan, Wall performed the Star Spangled Banner on guitar, to start the event, and afterwards Cosmic Knot performed a full set for over 10,000 people.

Discography
2015 Skee-Town Stylee All You Want
2015 The Muruga Band Mystic World
2016 Muruga, Tom and The Foreign Twoglets Pigdeeroo
2016 Muruga Blues Band Fool's Blues
2016 T (Featuring Muruga & Madcat Ruth) Deer Camp
2017 Cosmic Knot Inner Space
2017 Spacecraft Launch
2017 Muruga & The Microtones Spirit Jam

References

External links

Cosmic Knot on Spotify
Cosmic Knot on iHeartRadio

21st-century American singers
American male guitarists
American political activists
American rock guitarists
American rock singers
Lead guitarists
Living people
People from Fremont, Michigan
People from Grand Rapids, Michigan
Songwriters from Michigan
21st-century American guitarists
Guitarists from Michigan
People from Muskegon County, Michigan
21st-century American male singers
Year of birth missing (living people)
American male songwriters